Surratt is a surname. Notable people with the surname include:

Alfred Surratt (1922–2010), American baseball player
Chazz Surratt (born 1997), American football linebacker
Edward Surratt (born 1941), American convicted murderer and rapist
John Surratt (1844–1916), American Confederate Spy and conspirator in the assassination of Abraham Lincoln
Mary Surratt (1823–1865), American woman convicted as a conspirator in the assassination of Abraham Lincoln
Sage Surratt (born 1998), American football tight end
Valeska Suratt (1882–1962), American actress

See also
Sarratt (disambiguation)